Ray James Francis (March 8, 1893 – July 6, 1934) was a pitcher in Major League Baseball who played for the Washington Senators, Detroit Tigers, New York Yankees and Boston Red Sox in parts of three seasons spanning 1922–1925. He was born in Sherman, Texas.

Francis worked for the Wells Fargo in Oklahoma before deciding to play baseball. He changed his name from Roy to Ray after a local sportswriter made a typo in a local newspaper.

Besides his major league stint, Francis played for several minor league clubs in many cities and different leagues, including the Beaumont Oilers, San Antonio Bronchos (TL, 1917), Seattle Rainiers (PCL, 1920–1921), Atlanta Crackers (SOUA, 1924; 1926–1928; 1930) Minneapolis Millers (AA, 1925–1926), Birmingham Barons (SOUA, 1928–1930), and Raleigh Capitals (PIED, 1931–1932).

Francis posted a 12–28 record and a 4.65 earned run average in 82 major league appearances (36 starts), including 15 complete games, two shutouts and 25 games finished, striking out 96 batters while walking 110 in 337.0 innings of work. In a 10-year minor league career, he went 109–87 with a 3.49 ERA in 298 games.

After retirement, Francis worked for the police department of Atlanta  and was shot on duty. He died of a heart attack in 1934, at the age of 41, while breaking up a fight on duty. He is buried in Atlanta.

References

External links

Retrosheet

1893 births
1934 deaths
Atlanta Crackers players
Baseball players from Texas
Beaumont Oilers players
Birmingham Barons players
Boston Red Sox players
Detroit Tigers players
Major League Baseball pitchers
Minneapolis Millers (baseball) players
New York Yankees players
Raleigh Capitals players
San Antonio Bronchos players
Seattle Rainiers players
Washington Senators (1901–1960) players